Bay State may refer to:

Massachusetts, nickname "Bay State," a U.S. state with shores on Massachusetts Bay, Cape Cod Bay, Buzzards Bay and Narragansett Bay
Bay State College, a private university in Boston, Massachusetts
Bay State Conference, a high school athletic conference in Massachusetts
Bay State (TV series), the Boston University-produced soap opera
Bay State Road, a street on the Boston University campus
Bay State (musical instrument brand), a brand of musical instrument made in the 19th century by John C. Haynes & Co.
Baystate, a Japanese jazz record label